Calum Mallace (born 10 January 1990) is a former Scottish footballer who played as a midfielder. He retired from professional football at the conclusion of the 2019 USL Championship season. He is currently the head coach of Bavarian United SC in USL League Two and an assistant coach for the Loyola Ramblers.

Career

College and amateur
Mallace attended Henry Sibley High School in Mendota Heights, Minnesota. He then went on to spend four years at Marquette University, where he won awards such as the 2011 Big East Conference Midfielder of the Year, 2011 Second Team All-America, and was 2011 Marquette University Most Valuable Player.

Mallace also played in the USL Premier Development League for Chicago Fire Premier between 2009 and 2011.

Professional
On 12 January 2012, Mallace was selected #20 overall in the 2012 MLS SuperDraft by the Montreal Impact.

On August 8, 2017 he was traded to Seattle Sounders FC for a fourth-round pick in the 2017 MLS SuperDraft.

At the end of the 2017 season Mallace entered the 2017 MLS Re-Entry Draft after Seattle declined his contract option. On December 21, 2017, he was selected by Los Angeles FC in Stage Two of the draft.

Following his release from Los Angeles, Mallace joined USL Championship side Austin Bold ahead of their inaugural season. He retired at the end of the 2019 season.

Career statistics

Personal
Mallace has had U.S. citizenship since 2011. Born in Torphichen, Scotland, Mallace lived in Scotland until he moved to America when he was nine. Despite living in America throughout his life, Mallace had not ruled out play for the Scotland national team.

Honours

Montreal Impact
Canadian Championship (2): 2013, 2014

References

External links
 
 Marquette bio

1990 births
Living people
Association football midfielders
Austin Bold FC players
Chicago Fire U-23 players
Expatriate soccer players in Canada
Expatriate soccer players in the United States
Los Angeles FC players
Major League Soccer players
Marquette Golden Eagles men's soccer players
Minnesota United FC (2010–2016) players
CF Montréal draft picks
CF Montréal players
North American Soccer League players
People from Torphichen
Footballers from West Lothian
Scottish footballers
Scottish expatriate footballers
Scottish expatriate sportspeople in Canada
Scottish expatriate sportspeople in the United States
Seattle Sounders FC players
Tacoma Defiance players
USL Championship players
USL League Two players
Soccer players from Minnesota
Northwestern Wildcats men's soccer coaches
Loyola Ramblers men's soccer coaches